The following highways are numbered 289:

Canada
Manitoba Provincial Road 289                                                          
 Nova Scotia Route 289
 Quebec Route 289

Japan
 Japan National Route 289

United Kingdom                                                                                            
 A289 road (Great Britain)

United States
 Alabama State Route 289
 Arizona State Route 289
 Connecticut Route 289
 Florida State Road 289
 Georgia State Route 289 (former)
 Kentucky Route 289
 Maryland Route 289
 Minnesota State Highway 289
Montana Secondary Highway 289 (former)
 Nevada State Route 289
 New Mexico State Road 289
 New York State Route 289
 Ohio State Route 289
 Texas State Highway 289
 Texas State Highway Loop 289
 Farm to Market Road 289 (Texas)
 Utah State Route 289
 Vermont Route 289
 Virginia State Route 289